Robert Hutton (17 September 1879 – 1958) was an English footballer who played in the Football League for Chesterfield Town and The Wednesday.

References

1879 births
1958 deaths
English footballers
Association football forwards
English Football League players
Sheffield Wednesday F.C. players
Worksop Town F.C. players
Chesterfield F.C. players